Daulat Ke Dushman is an Indian Hindi movie directed by Bimal Rawal and produced by Manu Narang. The movie was released on 15 February 1983. The film stars Manjushree, Vinod Khanna, Ajit, Pran and Shatrughan Sinha. This film was actually named Paanch Dushman and set to release in 1973, but for some unknown reasons, it was finally released in 1983 with the name "Daulat Ke Dushman".

Cast
 Shatrughan Sinha
 Manjushree
 Vinod Khanna
 Ajit
 Pran
 Paintal
 Agha
 Bindu
 Brahmachari
 Prem Chopra
 Mohan Choti
 Helen
 Nasir Hussain
 Aruna Irani
 Manmohan
 Mehmood
 Mukri
 Jagdish Raj
 Sunder
 Manu Narang
 Rajee

Music
Lyrics: Majrooh Sultanpuri

 "Jeena Toh Hai, Par Ai Dil Kahan" - Kishore Kumar
 "Jana Hain Hume Toh Jahan Karar Mile" - Kishore Kumar, Lata Mangeshkar
 "Bichuva Bane Piya Tere Nain" - Asha Bhosle
 "Hum Toh Hain Sabke Yaar" - Kishore Kumar, Asha Bhosle
 "Jo Bhi Hua Hai Woh Pyar Me Hua hai" - Kishore Kumar
 "Samjha Me Kismat Khul Gaye" - Mohammed Rafi

References

External links

1983 films
Films scored by R. D. Burman
1980s Hindi-language films